The Livigno SkyMarathon is an international skyrunning competition held for the first time in 2016. It runs every year in Livigno (Italy) in June and is valid for the Skyrunner World Series.

Editions
SkyRace characteristics: 34 km and 2700 m climbing.

See also 
 Skyrunner World Series

References

External links 
 Official web site

Skyrunning competitions
Skyrunner World Series
Athletics competitions in Italy
Sport in Lombardy